Eugene Clark (born December 3, 1951) is an American-Canadian character actor and former football player.

Early life
Clark was born in Tampa, Florida. He attended Riverside Polytechnic High School.

Career

Football 
He was an actor four years before he began playing college football and he was an all-conference offensive guard at UCLA. Named to the first All-Star teams for both the Pacific-8 and the West Coast Athletic Conference, Clark also received All Star All American Honorable Mention Laurels, played in the Hula Bowl and was selected by the Pittsburgh Steelers in the ninth round of the 1975 NFL Draft. While he did not appear in a National Football League game, he did play in the Canadian Football League for 20 games for the Toronto Argonauts (in 1977 and 1978).

Acting
Clark had a prominent co-starring role as Sid Gomez in the 1990s science fiction show William Shatner's Tek War.

He also appeared on Night Heat, RoboCop: Prime Directives, The Twilight Zone, Side Effects, Tropical Heat, Sue Thomas: F.B.Eye, The L.A. Complex, and made a cameo in Trailer Park Boys: The Movie. He also starred in the VH1 film Man in the Mirror: The Michael Jackson Story, Fighting the Odds: The Marilyn Gambrell Story''', and the thriller Legend of the Mountain Witch.

Clark played the role of Mufasa in the Ontario Broadway production of The Lion King for two years.

Clark's best-known theatrical film role was in George A. Romero's Land of the Dead'' as the head zombie, "Big Daddy".

Filmography

Film

Television

References

Notes

External links

1955 births
Living people
African-American male actors
African-American players of American football
African-American players of Canadian football
American football offensive guards
American male film actors
American male television actors
Best Supporting Actor in a Drama Series Canadian Screen Award winners
Canadian football offensive linemen
Canadian male film actors
Canadian male television actors
Male actors from Los Angeles
Players of American football from Los Angeles
Players of American football from Tampa, Florida
Players of Canadian football from Los Angeles
Players of Canadian football from Tampa, Florida
Riverside Polytechnic High School alumni
Toronto Argonauts players
UCLA Bruins football players